Rue Es-Siaghine (Arabic: زنقة الصياغين, meaning Silversmith's Street, also transliterated as Rue Siaghin or Rue Siaghine) is a street in Tangier, Morocco. Under Roman Empire rule it was the decumanus maximus, the main thoroughfare of the city. The street led to the harbor through the south gate. Today the street is lined with cafes and bars and souvenir shops, and leads down into the Petit Socco in the medina of Tangier.

Buildings
At No. 44 is the Fondation Lorin, an arts centre which is also located along the street with displays dating back to the 1930s.
At No. 47 is Dar Niaba, a former administrative building noted for its courtyard growing oranges. From 1851 to 1920 the building served as the residence of the naib, the Moroccan high official who served as an intermediary between the sultan and foreign ambassadors.
At No. 51 is the Church of the Immaculate Conception, which was built by the Spanish in the 1880s and became the centre of the Christian community in Tangier.

See also
 Beit Yehuda Synagogue

References

Tangier
Tourist attractions in Tangier